Fenwick Island Lighthouse is a lighthouse in Delaware, United States, on the Delaware/Maryland state line. The structure dates back to 1858 making it the oldest lighthouse in the state of Delaware.

History 
In 1856, the United States Congress appropriated $25,000 for the Fenwick Island Lighthouse and on January 11, 1858 a ten-acre tract for the station was obtained from Mary C. Hall for only $50. The Fenwick Island Lighthouse was completed on December 29, 1858, but would not be lit until August 1, 1859. Construction was supervised by U.S. Army Captain William F. Raynolds. The lighthouse was built on an isolated peninsula in the southernmost portion of Delaware at the Maryland state line.  It is 87 feet tall, brick, with a central cast iron spiral staircase, and equipped with a third-order Fresnel lens. It was automated in 1940.

The lighthouse was decommissioned in 1978 and remained dark for several years.  A public movement to save the lighthouse resulted in ownership of the lighthouse being transferred to the State of Delaware, and the lighthouse was relit in 1982.  In 1997, after extensive fundraising efforts made it possible, the rapidly aging lighthouse underwent a full restoration. It was rededicated in July 1998.

The lighthouse is owned by the state of Delaware and maintained by the private, non-profit New Friends of the Fenwick Island Lighthouse.  The "isolated" lighthouse now stands surrounded by a neighborhood of houses and businesses.  Visitors can enter the base to view a small museum and gift shop. The lighthouse, however, is not open for climbing.

It was added to the National Register of Historic Places in 1979.

References

External links 

  Official Fenwick Island Lighthouse Website - includes 2009 season visiting information
Chesapeake Bay Lighthouse Project - Fenwick Island Light

Lighthouses completed in 1858
Lighthouses in Sussex County, Delaware
Lighthouses on the National Register of Historic Places in Delaware
Museums in Sussex County, Delaware
Lighthouse museums in the United States
National Register of Historic Places in Sussex County, Delaware
1858 establishments in Delaware